South Devon, formerly known as the Southern Division of Devon, was a parliamentary constituency in the county of Devon in England. From 1832 to 1885 it returned two Knights of the Shire to the House of Commons of the Parliament of the United Kingdom, elected by the bloc vote system.

Boundaries
In 1832 the county of Devon, in south western England, was divided for Parliamentary purposes between this constituency and North Devon. In 1868 the Devon county constituencies were re-arranged into North, South and East Devon divisions. Each of these divisions returned two members of Parliament.

In 1885 the three constituencies were again redrawn, so that Devon was represented by eight single member County constituencies (there were also three borough constituencies, two of which returned two members and the third one member). The county was split between the new smaller constituencies of Ashburton (alternatively the Mid Division), Barnstaple (the North-Western Division), Honiton (the Eastern Division), South Molton (the Northern Division), Tavistock (the Western Division), Tiverton (the North-Eastern Division), Torquay and Totnes (the Southern Division). The constituencies in this redistribution are normally referred to by the distinctive place name rather than the alternative compass point designation, so the South Devon division is considered to have been abolished in 1885.

1832–1868: The Hundreds of Axminster, Clyston, Colyton, Ottery St. Mary, East Budleigh, Lifton, Exminster, Teignbridge, Haytor, Coleridge, Stanborough, Ermington, Plympton, Roborough, and Tavistock, and Exeter Castle, and the parts of the hundred of Wonford that are not included in the city of Exeter.

1868–1885: The Hundreds of Black Torrington, Ermington, Lifton, Plympton, Roborough, Stanborough and Coleridge, and Tavistock.

Members of Parliament

Elections

Elections in the 1830s

Russell was appointed Home Secretary, requiring a by-election.

Elections in the 1840s

Courtenay resigned by accepting the office of Steward of the Chiltern Hundreds, causing a by-election.

Elections in the 1850s

Lopes' death caused a by-election.

Buller was elevated to the peerage, becoming 1st Baron Churston and causing a by-election.

Elections in the 1860s

Elections in the 1870s
Kekewich's death caused a by-election.

Lopes was appointed a Civil Lord of the Admiralty, requiring a by-election.

Elections in the 1880s

Garnier resigned, causing a by-election.

See also
List of former United Kingdom Parliament constituencies

References

 Boundaries of Parliamentary Constituencies 1885-1972, compiled and edited by F.W.S. Craig (Parliamentary Reference Publications 1972)
 British Parliamentary Election Results 1832-1885, compiled and edited by F.W.S. Craig (Macmillan Press 1977)
 Who's Who of British Members of Parliament: Volume I 1832-1885, edited by M. Stenton (The Harvester Press 1976)

Parliamentary constituencies in Devon (historic)
Constituencies of the Parliament of the United Kingdom established in 1832
Constituencies of the Parliament of the United Kingdom disestablished in 1885
Torquay